Pattumala Matha Church (Tamil: பட்டுமலை மாதா புனித ஆலயம்) is a Roman Catholic Latin Rite pilgrim shrine in Kerala dedicated to Our Lady of Good Health. It is served by the Congregation of the Missionary Brothers of Saint Francis of Assisi (CMSF). This church is having the largest Dome among christian churches in India.

The history of church dates back to british era, tea estate workers having great devotion to Mother Mary. In 1980's, Bro. Hippolitus Thadathil CMSF, a franciscan missionary brother of Kerala origin who came to pattumala realised the devotion & took the initiative; at first ashram chapel was used by devotees for the prayers and then in 1980's planned for a new church. The present church was blessed on 1998.

Architect J.P Bright, Thiruvananthapuram, is the designer of this church. The church is built entirely of granite and situated in the midst of tea plantations. The name Pattumala means "Hill Draped in Silk."

The church is designed in gothic style with a complete dome. The dome and roof of nave is pasted with beautifully designed slabs from inside.

The Dome of church being largest among christian churches in India.

At the entrance, main door frame is made of rock cut and there is rock cut portraits depicting various events in bible. The altar is of carved wood. All these add to the architectural excellence.

The church is believed to have two events of Marian Apparitions. Many miracles also have been attributed to the church.

Church is devoted to Mother Mary, in the name of Velankanni Matha and is known as Pattumala Matha as the name of place is. Also known as "Kochu Velankanni Church"; declared as Pilgrim Centre by Pope John Paul II. Devotees and tourist visit the church very often.

References

Roman Catholic churches in Kerala
Churches in Idukki district
Roman Catholic shrines in India
Church buildings with domes